Psycore was a Swedish heavy metal group formed in Gothenburg in 1996. The band consisted of vocalist Markus Jaan, guitarist Carlos Sepulveda, bass guitarist Hansi Baumgartner and drummer Hans Wilholm. Psycore disbanded after the second album I'm Not One of Us. The specific time of disbandment is unknown.

After break-up 
 After break-up band members Markus Jaan and Carlos Sepulveda founded a heavy metal group called Sweden's Finest. This band also disbanded after releasing two albums.
 Sepulveda and Jaan then created the alternative electronica group Mikrotone, featuring Freddie Wadling. Again, a short lived project with only one release entitled Spraylove.
 Sepulveda also founded the studio Belly of the Whale in order to record and produce these projects.
 Sepulveda has also started a new project in 2009 called Magellan Radio.
 
In 2014, Sepulveda became a member and producer of the band Leather Nun.

Discography 
 Albums
 1998: Your Problem 
 1999: I’m Not One of Us

 EPs
 1997: I Go Solo (7") (came as a give-away with Close Up magazine No. 26)
 1997: Future is Fact

 Singles
 1998: "Medication"
 1998: "I Go Solo"
 1998: "Fullblood Freak"
 1999: "The Zoo"

 Remixes
 1998: Dedicated Enemy (The Dot Remixes)

References

External links 
 Belly of the whale studio
 Magellan Radio

Swedish heavy metal musical groups